Deportivo Azogues was an Ecuadorian football club based in Azogues. It played in the Serie B, until they got relegated in 2015 into Segunda Categoria the third tier of football in Ecuador. It played its home games at the Estadio Municipal Jorge Andrade Cantos.

The Club did not present itself to play a match in the 3rd tier and later it was confirmed that it dissolved.

External links
 

Association football clubs established in 2005
Football clubs in Ecuador
2005 establishments in Ecuador